Ausserwelt is the second studio album by French band Year of No Light, released in 2010. It was originally released by Conspiracy Records (CD) & Music Fear Satan (2xLP).

Track listing

Personnel
Year of No Light
 Jérôme Alban – guitar
 Pierre Anouilh – guitar
 Bertrand Sébenne – drums, keyboards
 Johan Sébenne – bass guitar, keyboards, electronics
 Shiran Kaïdine - guitar
 Mathieu Mégemont - drums, keyboards, synthesizer

Technical personnel
 Cyrille Gachet – engineering and mixing
 Alan Douches – mastering
 Greg Vezon – album art and design

References

2010 albums
Year of No Light albums